BareNaked is the fourth studio album by actress and recording artist Jennifer Love Hewitt. It was released on October 8, 2002. The album became her most successful album to date, reaching the top 40 at no. 37 on the Billboard 200, making it her first album to appear on that chart. BareNaked spawned two singles, "BareNaked" and "Can I Go Now", and included a remake of Kris Kristofferson's "Me and Bobby McGee". The UK and Japanese editions of the album came with a bonus track called "Just Try", previously released as the B-side to "Can I Go Now".

Track listing

Personnel 
 Jennifer Love Hewitt – vocals
 Andrew Boston – DJ
 Dustin Boyer – guitar
 Meredith Brooks – acoustic guitar, electric guitar, background vocals
 Livingstone Brown – bass, keyboard, chant
 Chris Canute – hand drums
 Goldo – keyboard, vocals
 Glen Holmen – bass
 Abe Laboriel Jr. – drums
 Michael Parnell – keyboard
 Carolyn Perry – background vocals
 Darlene Perry – background vocals
 Sharon Perry – background vocals
 Rose Stone – background vocals
 Emerson Swinford – acoustic guitar, guitar

Production 
 Producers: Meredith Brooks, Gregg Alexander
 Engineers: Meredith Brooks, David Cole, Dave Darling, Goldo, Brad Haehnel, Phil Kaffel, Jeff Peters
 Mixing: Livingstone Brown, Brad Haehnel, Richard Travali
 Mastering: Chaz Harper
 Digital editing: Meredith Brooks, Andy Goldmark, Goldo, Michael Parnell
 Programming: Livingstone Brown, Dave Darling, Goldo
 Arranger: Dustin Boyer, Chris Canute
 Art direction: Nick Gamma, Jackie Murphy
 Design: Nick Gamma, Jackie Murphy
 Photography: Anthony Mandler
 Make-up: Agostina Lombardo

Chart performance

Album

Singles

References

External links 

Jennifer Love Hewitt albums
2002 albums
Jive Records albums